"Life Happened" is a song written by Kerry Kurt Phillips and Patrick Jason Matthews, and recorded by American country music artist Tammy Cochran.  It was released in June 2002 as the first single and title track from the album Life Happened.  The song reached #20 on the Billboard Hot Country Singles & Tracks chart.

Chart performance

References

2002 singles
2002 songs
Tammy Cochran songs
Epic Records singles
Songs written by Kerry Kurt Phillips
Songs written by Patrick Jason Matthews
Song recordings produced by Billy Joe Walker Jr.